Backyard Ballistics is a how-to book by William Gurstelle that was published in 2001. It is full of experiments that can be done relatively inexpensively and can be easily executed. It also includes the history and mechanical principles of some of the inventions and projects. From catapults to rockets, this book describes accessible ways to create these at home or in the classroom. In addition to recreational use by individuals, teacher's guides have been developed and science fair projects designed around this book. It has been cited in several educational and scientific journals.

References

External links
Author William Gurstelle's website
Backyard Ballistics Teacher's Guide
Backyard Ballistics website
William Gurstelle presentation on the Art of Living Dangerously

2001 non-fiction books
Handbooks and manuals
Engineering books
Mechanical engineering